The Association of Educational Psychologists is a trade union in the United Kingdom.

The British Psychological Society represented educational psychologists until 1962, when it received chartered status.  Those members who wished to remain part of a body able to negotiate on their behalf formed the "Association of Educational Psychologists", although it delegated the actual negotiations to the National Union of Teachers and the Ulster Teachers Union.

In 1997, the organisation took over negotiation duties from the National Union of Teachers, and in 1999, it affiliated to the Trades Union Congress.  It only began accepting members in Scotland in 2003.

References

External links
Official Website

Trade unions established in 1962
Educational psychology organizations
Trade unions in the United Kingdom
Education trade unions
Trade unions based in County Durham
Trade unions affiliated with the Trades Union Congress